The Esquimalt station is located in Esquimalt, British Columbia. The station was a flag stop on Via Rail's Dayliner service, which has been indefinitely suspended since 2011. The station opened in 1886, and was the original terminus of the line until the extension to Victoria.

References 

Via Rail stations in British Columbia
Disused railway stations in Canada